Dichagyris romanovi is a moth of the family Noctuidae. It is found from Turkey and Transcaucasia to south-western Iran, Israel and Jordan.

Adults are on wing from March to November. There is one generation per year.

External links
 Noctuinae of Israel

romanovi
Insects of Turkey
Moths of the Middle East
Moths described in 1885